The Gyeonggi Museum of Art is an art museum opened in 2006 in Ansan, South Korea as an art and cultural institution for 13 million residents. Founded by Gyeonggi-do and operated by the Gyeonggi Cultural Foundation, the Gyeonggi-do Museum of Art has grown into a representative art museum in the Seoul metropolitan area by communicating with visitors through collection, preservation, research, exhibition and education activities of modern art, which will be a future asset of Gyeonggi-do.

References

External links
 Gyeonggi Museum of Art - 

Art museums and galleries in South Korea
Buildings and structures in Ansan
Museums in Gyeonggi Province